Kathleen Ann (Kit) Hollerbach is an American stand-up comedian and actress. She was born in Sacramento, California.

In 1985, Hollerbach was a founding member of The Comedy Store Players. In the film Batman she played Becky Narita, the TV news anchor poisoned on air by The Joker.

Hollerbach co-wrote and performed in the BBC radio sitcoms Unnatural Acts and At Home with the Hardys.

Personal life
Hollerbach was married to British comedian Jeremy Hardy from 1986 until 2006. They have one daughter. Both appeared in many of the same shows. She became a teacher in 1996.

References

External links

Living people
People from Sacramento, California
American emigrants to England
American stand-up comedians
American film actresses
American women comedians
Year of birth missing (living people)